was a town located in Nishiuwa District, Ehime Prefecture, Japan.

As of 2003, the town had an estimated population of 2,696 and a density of 84.01 persons per km2. The total area was 32.09 km2.

On April 1, 2005, Seto, along with the town of Misaki (also from Nishiuwa District), was merged into the expanded town of Ikata.

Climate

References

Dissolved municipalities of Ehime Prefecture
Ikata, Ehime